Mazinan Rural District is a rural district (dehestan) in Central, Davarzan County, Razavi Khorasan Province, Iran. In the 2006 census its population was 6,064.  The rural district has 12 villages.

References 

Rural Districts of Razavi Khorasan Province
Davarzan County